Boris Perušič (born 27 July 1940) is a Czech former volleyball player of Croatian descent who competed for Czechoslovakia in the 1964 Summer Olympics.

He was born in Zagreb.

In 1964 he was part of the Czechoslovak team which won the silver medal in the Olympic tournament. He played eight matches.

External links
 profile

1940 births
Living people
Czech men's volleyball players
Czechoslovak men's volleyball players
Olympic volleyball players of Czechoslovakia
Volleyball players at the 1964 Summer Olympics
Olympic silver medalists for Czechoslovakia
Sportspeople from Zagreb
Olympic medalists in volleyball

Medalists at the 1964 Summer Olympics